Skrzypiów  is a village in the village of Pińczów in Pińczów commune, in Pińczów County in Pińczów Voivodeship, in south-central Poland.

References

Villages in Pińczów County